Gamma-butyrobetaine dioxygenase (also known as BBOX, GBBH or γ-butyrobetaine hydroxylase) is an enzyme that in humans is encoded by the BBOX1 gene. Gamma-butyrobetaine dioxygenase catalyses the formation of L-carnitine from gamma-butyrobetaine, the last step in the L-carnitine biosynthesis pathway. Carnitine is essential for the transport of activated fatty acids across the mitochondrial membrane during mitochondrial beta oxidation. In humans, gamma-butyrobetaine dioxygenase can be found in kidney (high), liver (moderate), and brain (very low). BBOX1 has recently been identified as a potential cancer gene on the basis of a large-scale microarray data analysis.

Reaction

Gamma-butyrobetaine dioxygenase belongs to the 2-oxoglutarate (2OG)-dependent dioxygenase superfamily. It catalyses the following reaction:
4-trimethylammoniobutanoate (γ-butyrobetaine) + 2-oxoglutarate + O2  3-hydroxy-4-trimethylammoniobutanoate (L-carnitine) + succinate + CO2

The three substrates of this enzyme are 4-trimethylammoniobutanoate (γ-butyrobetaine), 2-oxoglutarate, and O2, whereas its three products are 3-hydroxy-4-trimethylammoniobutanoate (L-carnitine), succinate, and carbon dioxide.

This enzyme belongs to the family of oxidoreductases, specifically those acting on paired donors, with O2 as oxidant and incorporation or reduction of oxygen. The oxygen incorporated need not be derived from O2 with 2-oxoglutarate as one donor, and incorporation of one atom of oxygen into each donor. This enzyme participates in lysine degradation. Iron is a cofactor for gamma-butyrobetaine dioxygenase. Similar to many other 2OG oxygenases, the activity of gamma-butyrobetaine dioxygenase can be stimulated by reducing agents such as ascorbate and glutathione. The catalytic activity of gamma-butyrobetaine dioxygenase can be stimulated with different metal ions, especially potassium ions.

Both the apo (PDB id: 3N6W) and the holo (PDB id: 3O2G) structures of gamma-butyrobetaine dioxygenase have been solved, demonstrating an induced fit mechanism may contribute to the catalytic activity of gamma-butyrobetaine dioxygenase.

Gamma-butyrobetaine dioxygenase is promiscuous in substrate selectivity and it processes a number of modified substrates, including the natural catalytic products L-carnitine and D-carnitine, forming 3-dehydrocarnitine and trimethylaminoacetone. Gamma-butyrobetaine dioxygenase also catalyses the oxidation of mildronate to form multiple products including malonic acid semialdehyde, dimethylamine, formaldehyde and (1-methylimidazolidin-4-yl)acetic acid, which is proposed to be formed via a Stevens rearrangement mechanism. Gamma-butyrobetaine dioxygenase is unique among other human 2OG oxygenases that it catalyses both hydroxylation (e.g.: L-carnitine), demethylation (e.g.: formaldehyde) and C-C bond formation (e.g.: (1-methylimidazolidin-4-yl)acetic acid).

Inhibition

Gamma-butyrobetaine dioxygenase is an inhibition target for 3-(2,2,2-trimethylhydraziniumyl)propionate (mildronate, also known as THP, MET-88, Meldonium or Quarterine). Mildronate is offered, clinically, to non-U.S. markets, in treatment of angina and myocardial infarction. Some studies suggested that mildronate may also be beneficial for the treatment of neurological disorder, diabetes, and seizures and alcohol intoxication. Mildronate is currently manufactured and marketed by Grindeks, a pharmaceutical company based in Latvia. To date, at least five clinical trial reports were published in peer-reviewed journals documenting the efficacy and safety of mildronate on the treatments of angina, stroke and chronic heart failure.  However, there have been no randomized clinical trials to support the use of mildronate to treat any cardiovascular disease.

Mildronate has a similar structure to the natural substrate gamma-butyrobetaine, with a NH group replacing the CH2 of gamma-butyrobetaine at the C-4 position. A crystal structure of mldronate in complex with gamma-butyrobetaine dioxygenase was published, and it suggests mildronate bind to gamma-butyrobetaine dioxygenase in exactly the same way as gamma-butyrobetaine (PDB id: 3MS5). To date, most enzyme inhibitors for human 2OG oxygenases bind to the cosubstrate 2OG binding site; mildronate is a rare example of a non-peptidyl substrate mimic inhibitor. Although initial reports suggested mildronate is a non-competitive and non-hydroxylatable analogue of gamma-butyrobetaine, further studies have identified mildronate is indeed a substrate for gamma-butyrobetaine dioxygenase.

Similar to other 2OG oxygenases, gamma-butyrobetaine dioxygenase can be inhibited by 2OG mimics and aromatic inhibitors such as pyridine 2,4-dicarboxylate. Other reported gamma-butyrobetaine dioxygenase inhibitors include cyclopropyl-substituted gamma-butyrobetaines and 3-(2,2-dimethylcyclopropyl)propanoic acid, which is a mechanism-based enzyme inhibitor.

Assay

Several in vitro biochemical assays have been applied to monitor the catalytic activity of gamma-butyrobetaine dioxygenase. Early methods have mainly focused on the use of radiolabeled compounds, including 14C-labelled gamma-butyrobetaine and 14C-labelled 2OG. Enzyme-coupled method have also been applied to detect carnitine formation, by using the enzyme carnitine acetyltransferase and 14C-labelled acetyl-coenzyme A to give labelled acetylcarnitine for detection. Using this method, it is possible to detect carnitine concentration down to the pico-molar range. Other analytical methods including mass spectrometry and NMR have also been applied, and they are in particularly useful for the study of the coupling ratio between 2OG oxidation and substrate formation, and for the characterisation of unknown enzymatic products. However, these methods are often not suitable for high-throughput screening and require expensive instrumentation. A potentially high-throughput fluorescence-based assay has also been proposed by using a fluorinated-gamma-butyrobetaine analog. The fluoride ions released as a result of gamma-butyrobetaine dioxygenase catalyses can be detected by using chemosensors such as protected fluorescein.

See also 
Carnitine
Mildronate
Carnitine biosynthesis
Beta Oxidation
Fatty acid metabolism
Stevens rearrangement

References

Further reading 

 
 
 
 

Human 2OG oxygenases
EC 1.14.11
Iron enzymes
Ascorbate enzymes